Tobias Rosen is a German film producer, best known for his film, Watu Wote/All of Us for which he received critical acclaim and received an Academy Award nomination for Academy Award for Best Live Action Short Film.

Awards and nominations
 Nominated: Academy Award for Best Live Action Short Film

References

External links
 

1980s births
Living people
German film producers
Film people from Nuremberg